Battle of Krasne (February 20 – February 23, 1651) was a battle of the Khmelnytsky Uprising. Polish–Lithuanian Commonwealth forces under the command of Marcin Kalinowski defeated the Cossacks forces under the command of Danylo Nechay. Danylo Nechay was killed in battle.

The battle of Krasne took place in the town of Krasne near Tyvriv (Tywrow), when Cossack Colonel Neczaj broke the Treaty of Zboriv, and raided Braclaw Voivodeship. To halt the Cossacks, Poles sent Hetman Marcin Kalinowski, supported by Voivode of Braclaw, Stanislaw Lanckoronski. Altogether, Polish forces had some 12 000 men.

After the capture of Szarogrod, the Cossacks headed towards Bar, but upon hearing of approaching Polish forces, they camped in the town of Krasne. Poles reached Krasne on February 20, 1651, and seized the town after a short skirmish. Kalinowski then split his forces into two parts, and attacked Cossack camp. The battle turned into a massacre: among victims was Neczaj himself. Some Cossacks managed to flee to the nearby castle, where their fought until February 23. Total Cossack losses are unknown, but they might have reached 10 000 dead.

After this success, Kalinowski marched deeper into Podolia, seizing several towns, such as Szarogrod, Jampol and Skinderpol. After losing a battle near Winnica, Poles had to retreat back to Volhynia.

References

Władysław Andrzej Serczyk: Na płonącej Ukrainie. Dzieje Kozaczyzny 1648–1651. Warszawa: Książka i Wiedza, 1998, p. 328-329. .
 Maciej Franz: Wojskowość Kozaczyzny Zaporoskiej w XVI-XVII wieku. Geneza i charakter. Toruń: Adam Marszałek, 2004, p. 222. .

Conflicts in 1651
1651 in Europe
Krasne